This page lists public opinion polls conducted for the 2009 European Parliament election in France, which was held on 7 June 2009.

Unless otherwise noted, all polls listed below are compliant with the regulations of the national polling commission (Commission nationale des sondages) and utilize the quota method.

Graphical summary 
The averages in the graphs below were constructed using polls listed below conducted by the seven major French pollsters. The graphs are smoothed 14-day weighted moving averages, using only the most recent poll conducted by any given pollster within that range (each poll weighted based on recency).

Because the Ipsos poll conducted from 5 to 6 June was not published during the electoral silence, it is not included in the average below.

Voting intentions 
Polls conducted specifically for subsample data are listed with one asterisk (*), while the hypothetical poll conducted for the Left Party by Ifop in January 2009 is marked with two asterisks (**). The Ipsos poll conducted from 5 to 6 June was an internal survey which was not distributed during the electoral silence.

By constituency

Nord-Ouest

Ouest

Est

Sud-Ouest

Sud-Est

Massif-Central Centre

Île-de-France

See also 
Opinion polling for the 2014 European Parliament election in France
Opinion polling for the 2019 European Parliament election in France

External links 
Notices of the French polling commission 

Opinion polling in France
France